The Idea Hydropteron is a Hungarian light-sport aircraft and kit aircraft amphibious flying boat, under development by Idea Aircraft, of Miskolc. The Hydropteron was first flown on 25 November 2009 and introduced to the public at the AERO Friedrichshafen show in 2010. The aircraft is intended to be supplied as a kit for amateur construction or as a complete ready-to-fly-aircraft.

Design and development
The aircraft was designed to comply with the US light-sport aircraft rules in its two-seat version and amateur-built rules as a three seater. It features a cantilever high-wing, a two-seats-in-side-by-side configuration enclosed cockpit under a bubble canopy, with a third seat optional, a cruciform tail, retractable tricycle landing gear and a single engine in pusher configuration.

The aircraft is made from composites. The standard engine is the  Rotax 914 four-stroke turbocharged powerplant, but engines of up to  may be fitted. No wingtip floats are fitted and the aircraft relies on fuselage-mounted sponsons for water stability.

Production was originally scheduled for 2011, but as of early-2017 only prototypes appear to have been flown.

Specifications (Hydropteron LSA)

References

External links

Homebuilt aircraft
Light-sport aircraft
Single-engined pusher aircraft